This article shows the rosters of all participating teams at the Men's U23 World Championship 2015 in United Arab Emirates.

Pool A

The following is the Cuban roster in the 2015 FIVB Volleyball Men's U23 World Championship.

Head coach: Rodolfo Sanchez

The following is the Italian roster in the 2015 FIVB Volleyball Men's U23 World Championship.

Head coach: Michele Totire

The following is the Iranian roster in the 2015 FIVB Volleyball Men's U23 World Championship.

Head coach: Akbari Peyman

The following is the Korean roster in the 2015 FIVB Volleyball Men's U23 World Championship.

Head coach: Haechon Hong

The following is the Egyptian roster in the 2015 FIVB Volleyball Men's U23 World Championship.

Head coach: Grzegorz Rys

The following is the Emirati roster in the 2015 FIVB Volleyball Men's U23 World Championship.

Head coach: Morad Sennoun

Pool B

The following is the Russian roster in the 2015 FIVB Volleyball Men's U23 World Championship.

Head coach: Mikhail Nikolaev

The following is the Turkish roster in the 2015 FIVB Volleyball Men's U23 World Championship.

Head coach: Emanuele Zanini

The following is the Brazilian roster in the 2015 FIVB Volleyball Men's U23 World Championship.

Head coach: Roberley Leonaldo

The following is the Argentinean roster in the 2015 FIVB Volleyball Men's U23 World Championship.

Head coach: Martin Lopez

The following is the Tunisian roster in the 2015 FIVB Volleyball Men's U23 World Championship.

Head coach: Moncef Belaiba

The following is the Mexican roster in the 2015 FIVB Volleyball Men's U23 World Championship.

Head coach: Juan Vilches

See also
2015 FIVB Volleyball Women's U23 World Championship squads

References

External links
Official website

FIVB Volleyball Men's U23 World Championship
FIVB Volleyball Men's U23 World Championship
FIVB Volleyball Men's U23 World Championship
International volleyball competitions hosted by the United Arab Emirates
FIVB Volleyball Men's U23 World Championship
FIVB Volleyball World Championship squads